Knockmore is a mountain on Clare Island off the coast of County Mayo, Ireland.

Geography 

Access to the summit 
It is a popular walking destination for island residents and tourists and is known for its view of Clew Bay and the west coast mainland as well as a view of the Atlantic Ocean.

See also
List of mountains in Ireland
List of islands of Ireland

References

Mountains and hills of County Mayo
Marilyns of Ireland